Francisco José may refer to:

Francisco José Arnáiz Zarandona
Francisco José Borja Cevallos
Francisco José Caeiro
Francisco José Camarasa
Francisco José Carrasco
Francisco José Cox
Francisco José Cróquer
Francisco José Debali
Francisco José Fernandes Costa
Francisco José Fernández Mas
Francisco José Freire
Francisco José Furtado
Francisco José Garanito Sousa
Francisco José Jattin Safar
Francisco José Lara
Francisco José Lloreda Mera
Francisco José Lombardi
Francisco José López Fernández
Francisco José Madero González
Francisco José Maldonado
Francisco José Martínez
Francisco José Millán Mon
Francisco José Monagas
Francisco José Múgica
Francisco José Nicolás González
Francisco José Pacheco
Francisco José Pinheiro
Francisco José Pérez
Francisco José Ribas
Francisco José Rodríguez Gaitán
Francisco José Sánchez Rodríguez
Francisco José Tenreiro
Francisco José Urrutia Holguín
Francisco José Urrutia Olano
Francisco José Ynduráin
Francisco José de Almeida Lopes
Francisco José de Caldas
Francisco José de Ovando, 1st Marquis of Brindisi

See also